The Ash-Lad – Pål's Story (Askeladden – Påls versjon) is a children's opera composed by Marcus Paus to a Norwegian-language libretto by Ole Paus. It was commissioned by the Norwegian National Opera and Ballet and premiered in 2011. Consisting of three scenes with a duration of about 80 minutes, it is based on the Norwegian fairy tales about Askeladden (The Ash-Lad) and tells the story from the perspective of the perennial loser and underdog, the Ash-Lad's brother Pål.

References

Compositions by Marcus Paus
2011 operas
Children's operas
Operas set in Norway
Norwegian-language operas
Operas set in fictional, mythological and folkloric settings
Operas